OpenLogos is an open source program that translates from English and German into French, Italian, Spanish and Portuguese. It accepts various document formats and maintains the format of the original document in translation. OpenLogos does not claim to replace human translators; rather, it aims to enhance the human translator's work environment.

The OpenLogos program is based on the Logos Machine Translation System, one of the earliest commercial machine translation programs. The original program was developed by Logos Corporation in the United States, with additional development teams in Germany and Italy.

History 

Logos Corporation was founded by Bernard (Bud) Scott in 1970, who worked on its Logos Machine Translation System until the company's dissolution in 2000. The project began as an English-Vietnamese translation system, which became operational in 1972 (during the American-Vietnam War), and later was developed as a multi-target translation solution, with English and German as source languages. Recently, the German Research Center for Artificial Intelligence has been working on OpenLogos, a Linux-compatible version of the original Logos program released under the GNU GPL license.

Languages 

Currently, OpenLogos translates from German and English into French, Italian, Spanish and Portuguese. In the long term, the goal of OpenLogos developers is to support bidirectional translation among these languages.

Historical competitors 
 SYSTRAN Language Translation Technologies
 SDL International and its free translator
 Intergraph
 Siemens' METAL MT

See also 
 Apertium
 Comparison of machine translation applications
 Moses
 Weidner

Bibliography 
 Anabela Barreiro, Johanna Monti, Brigitte Orliac, Susanne Preuß, Kutz Arrieta, Wang Ling, Fernando Batista, Isabel Trancoso, "Linguistic Evaluation of Support Verb Constructions by OpenLogos and Google Translate", In Proceedings of the Ninth International Conference on Language Resources and Evaluation (LREC'14), European Language Resources Association (ELRA), pages 35–40, Reykjavik, Iceland, May 2014
 Anabela Barreiro, Fernando Batista, Ricardo Ribeiro, Helena Moniz, Isabel Trancoso, "OpenLogos Semantico-Syntactic Knowledge-Rich Bilingual Dictionaries", In Proceedings of the Ninth International Conference on Language Resources and Evaluation (LREC'14), European Language Resources Association (ELRA), pages 3774–3781, May 2014
 Anabela Barreiro, Bernard Scott, Walter Kasper, Bernd Kiefer. "OpenLogos Rule-Based Machine Translation: Philosophy, Model, Resources and Customization". Machine Translation, volume 25 number 2, Pages 107–126, Springer, Heidelberg, 2011. , 
 Bernard Scott, Anabela Barreiro. "OpenLogos MT and the SAL representation language". In Proceedings of the First International Workshop on Free/Open-Source Rule-Based Machine Translation / Edited by Juan Antonio Pérez-Ortiz, Felipe Sánchez-Martínez, Francis M. Tyers. Alicante, Spain: Universidad de Alicante. Departamento de Lenguajes y Sistemas Informáticos. 2–3 November 2009, pp. 19–26 
 Bernard Scott: "The Logos Model: An Historical Perspective", in Machine Translation, vol. 18 (2003), pp. 1–72
 Bernard Scott. Linguistic and computational motivations for the LOGOS machine translation system 
 OpenLogos introduction by Bernard (Bud) Scott in OpenLogos Mt-list (mailing list)
 Bernard Scott. Translation, Brains and the Computer. A Neurolinguistic Solution to Ambiguity and Complexity in Machine Translation. Machine Translation: Technologies and Applications 2, Springer 2018, ISBN 978-3-319-76628-7, pp. 3-241

External links
Official Website
OpenLogos Demo
SourceForge Project Page
Creator's technical overview as of February 26, 2012 (Wayback Machine, accessed April 17, 2021)

Free software programmed in C++
Machine translation software